Osborne Harold Peasgood CVO (5 March 1902 – 25 January 1962) was an organist at Westminster Abbey who played at a number of state occasions in the Abbey, including the Coronation of Queen Elizabeth II.

Peasgood was born in London on 5 March 1902 and gained a scholarship to the Royal College of Music when he was 17. He became a Fellow of the Royal College of Organists in 1926 followed by a doctorate at Dublin in 1936. Peasgood taught the organ at the Royal College of Music and had become sub-organist at Westminster Abbey from 1924.

Peasgood also composed two services and from Handel's Water Music, he published an edition of a suite for the organ.

See also
List of Westminster Abbey organists

References

1902 births
1962 deaths
Musicians from London
English organists
British male organists
Commanders of the Royal Victorian Order
Alumni of the Royal College of Music
Academics of the Royal College of Music
Cathedral organists
People associated with Westminster Abbey
People educated at Kilburn Grammar School
20th-century classical musicians
20th-century English musicians
20th-century organists
20th-century British male musicians
20th-century British musicians
Male classical organists